Line 10 of Tianjin Metro is a metro line in Tianjin, China.

History
On 14 September 2015, Line 10 from Liyuantou to Nandian was approved by National Development and Reform Commission as part of Phase II Construction Plan of Tianjin Rail Transit.

Construction of Yudongcheng station on Line 10 started on 28 July 2016.

The section from Yutai to Yudongcheng opened on 18 November 2022.

Stations (southwest to northeast)

Future Development
Phase 1 North Section
It will be fully underground and 3.325 km in length, with 2 new stations.

Southern extension
The extension will be 1.32 km in length with 1 new station.

References

Tianjin Metro lines
Railway lines opened in 2022